Evelyn Amanda Davidson White (February 1, 1921 – July 2, 2007) was an American author, vocal teacher and Howard University Choral Director.

White was born in Charlotte, North Carolina, to Rev. William H. Davidson, a Baptist minister, and Florence Gidney Davidson. She was influential in the training of many students who went on to make their marks in the music world, including Roberta Flack, Donny Hathaway, Jesse Norman, Samuel Bonds, and Richard Smallwood.

Works

References

1921 births
2007 deaths
People from Charlotte, North Carolina
20th-century American women writers
20th-century American non-fiction writers
Women music educators
Music directors
Howard University faculty
American women non-fiction writers
20th-century women musicians
American women academics
20th-century African-American women writers
20th-century African-American writers
21st-century African-American people
21st-century African-American women